Trabzon İdmanocağı Women's Volleyball, or in short: İdman Ocağı Women's Volleyball, is the women's volleyball team of the multi-sport club Trabzon İdmanocağı in Turkey. The team plays in the Turkish Women's First Volleyball League. In the 2015–16 season, the team was renamed after their sponsor Imperial Hastanesi İdmanocağı (Imperial Hospital İdmanocağı).

Current squad
As of 2015–16 season.

 Manager: Gökhan Rahman Çokşen
 Assistant coach: Coşkun Karadeniz
 Assistant coach: İzzet Yiğit Alkılınç

Legend
L-Libero, MB-Middle Blocker, OH-Opposite Hitter, S-Setter, WS-Wing Spiker.

References

Volleyball women's
Women's volleyball teams in Turkey